Besnoitia tarandi is a species of single-celled parasites that afflicts reindeer.

The Beltsville Agricultural Research Center, in collaboration with a Finnish university, studied Besnoitia tarandi tissue cysts from infected reindeer.

References 

Conoidasida